Mathias Schils (born 1 May 1993) is a Belgian footballer.

External links
 
 

1993 births
Living people
Belgian footballers
Sint-Truidense V.V. players
SC Cambuur players
K.M.S.K. Deinze players
Belgian Pro League players
Challenger Pro League players
Eerste Divisie players
Sportspeople from Hasselt
Footballers from Limburg (Belgium)
Association football defenders
21st-century Belgian people